or  or  is a fjord in Nordland county, Norway. The fjord is the border between Narvik Municipality and Hamarøy Municipality. The island of Hulløya is located about halfway through the fjord, right before the fjord splits in to several smaller branches.

There is no bridge or tunnel crossing the fjord and there are no roads going around it either, so the ferry is the only way to travel past the fjord without going through Sweden. There are regular ferry crossings over the fjord go between Bognes and Skarberget (E6), and between Drag and Kjøpsvik (road 827).

See also
 List of Norwegian fjords

References

External links

Tysfjord
Narvik
Fjords of Nordland